Groovy Aardvark was a Canadian rock band active since 1986 in the Québec  music scene. They performed in English and in French.

History
In 1986, the band Schizophrenic Muff Divers was formed by five college (Edouard-Montpetit) students from Longueuil, Québec.   The members of the band were Vincent and Danny Peake, Stéphane Vigeant, Eric Lajambe and Marc-André Thibert.  A year later the band changed its name to Groovy Aardvark.

They released three cassette tape demos before releasing their first album, Eater's Digest, in 1994. Although all of the members spoke French natively, most of the songs on this album were in English.  After the release the band toured for two months in Québec.

Groovy Aardvark released a second album Vacuum, in 1996. The band toured in Canada, the United States and Europe.

Their final concert was staged in August 2005.

In 2012 the band came back together for a reunion show at the Montreal FrancoFollies festival.

Members
Final Lineup
Vincent Peake – lead vocals, bass (1986–2005)
Martin Dupuis – guitars (1993–2005)
François Legendre – guitars (2002–2005)
Pierre Koch – drums (1996–2005)

Former members
Éric Lajambe – lead vocals (1986)
Marc-André Thibert – guitars (1986–1999)
Stéphane Vigeant – guitars (1986–1991)
Martin Pelletier – guitars (1992–1993; died 2016)
Denis Lepage – guitars (1999–2002)
Danny Peake – drums (1986–1996)
Louis Bélanger – percussion (1991–1994)

Timeline

Discography
1994: Eater's Digest
1996: Vacuum
1998: Oryctérope
1999: Exit Stage Dive
2000: Fast Times at Longueuil High (compilation)
2002: Masothérapie
2005: Sévices rendus

References

External links
 Québec Info Musique: Groovy Aardvark
 Diffusion YFB: Groovy Aardvark
 FrancoFolies 2016

Musical groups established in 1986
Canadian alternative rock groups
Longueuil
Musical groups from Quebec
Musical groups disestablished in 2005
1986 establishments in Quebec
2005 disestablishments in Quebec